An-Magritt Jensen (born 1947) is a Norwegian sociologist. Since 1997, she is Professor of Sociology at the Norwegian University of Science and Technology (NTNU). She holds a cand.polit. degree from 1975 and a dr.polit. degree from 1996. Her research fields are family changes, fertility and sociology of childhood. She has been vice chair of the Norwegian Sociological Association and a board member at NTNU. She is a member of the Royal Norwegian Society of Sciences and Letters.

Publications
BARNDOM - forvandling uten forhandling. Samboerskap, foreldreskap og søskenskap, 2008
Children's Welfare in Ageing Europe (2004)
Samboerskap som foreldreskap, 1999
Samboerskap og foreldrebrudd etter 1970, 1997
Samvær og fravær. Foreldres kontakt med barn de ikke bor sammen med, 1997

References

Norwegian sociologists
Norwegian women sociologists
Living people
1947 births